Frédéric Meyrieu (born 9 February 1968) is a French former professional football player.

Honours

Player
FC Sion
Swiss Championship: 1996–97
Swiss Cup: 1996–97

References

External links
 
  Player profile at lequipe.fr

1968 births
Living people
People from La Seyne-sur-Mer
Sportspeople from Var (department)
Association football midfielders
French footballers
Olympique de Marseille players
Le Havre AC players
FC Girondins de Bordeaux players
SC Toulon players
RC Lens players
FC Sion players
FC Metz players
Ligue 1 players
Footballers from Provence-Alpes-Côte d'Azur